Orange Beach is a resort city in Baldwin County, Alabama, United States. As of the 2020 Census, the population was 8,095.

Geography
Orange Beach is located along the Gulf of Mexico, and is the easternmost community on Alabama's Gulf Coast, with Florida's Perdido Key bordering it to the east. The city of Gulf Shores is to the west.

Climate
Orange Beach has a humid subtropical climate, with mild-to-warm winters, and hot and humid summers.

Demographics

2020 census

As of the 2020 United States census, there were 8,095 people, 2,966 households, and 1,625 families residing in the city.

2010 census
As of the census of 2010, there were 5,441 people, 2,492 households, and 1,544 families residing in the city. The racial makeup of the city was 94.3% White, 0.6% Black or African American, 0.7% Native American, 0.8% Asian, 1.4% from other races, and 2.2% from two or more races. 2.6% of the population were Hispanic or Latino of any race.

There were 2,492 households, out of which 21.6% had children under the age of 18 living with them, 50.2% were married couples living together, 7.5% had a female householder with no husband present, and 38.0% were non-families. 30.5% of all households were made up of individuals, and 10.8% had someone living alone who was 65 years of age or older. The average household size was 2.18 and the average family size was 2.70.

In the city, the population was 18.7% under the age of 18, 6.7% from 18 to 24, 23.7% from 25 to 44, 31.7% from 45 to 64, and 19.2% who were 65 years of age or older. The median age was 45.5 years. For every 100 females, there were 98.8 males. For every 100 females age 18 and over, there were 96.1 males. The median income for a household in the city was $66,656, and the median income for a family was $69,964. Males had a median income of $54,806 versus $47,019 for females. The per capita income for the city was $40,153. About 1.2% of families and 3.0% of the population were below the poverty line, including 0.0% of those under age 18 and 2.8% of those age 65 or over.

Sports
The city of Orange Beach hosts many sporting events and tournaments at the Orange Beach Sportsplex. The Sportsplex, located north of the Gulf State Park and a short distance from The Wharf, comprises a football/soccer stadium with a seating capacity of 1,500. The facility also has several baseball and softball fields. The Backcountry Trail system through the Gulf State Park has a trailhead located at the Sportsplex.

The Sportsplex has hosted the SEC Women's Soccer Tournament on numerous occasions, in addition to the NCAA Division II men and women's soccer tournament. The facility once served as home to the Alabama Lightning of the North American Football League.

Orange Beach is home to the Orange Beach Running Club, which meets every Monday evening to run a 5K.

Education
Orange Beach is part of the Baldwin County Public Schools system. Orange Beach Elementary School is the city's only school and serves students in grades kindergarten through sixth grade. Students in grades seven and twelve attend Orange Beach Middle and High School.

Previously residents were zoned to Gulf Shores Middle School and Gulf Shores High School in neighboring Gulf Shores. In 2019 those schools separated into the Gulf Shores City Schools district. For the 2019-2020 school year Orange Beach grade 7-10 students and grade 7-10 students in unincorporated areas had a choice between remaining with Gulf Shores schools or attending temporary classrooms established by Baldwin County schools. Orange Beach Middle and High opened in 2020.

Columbia Southern University is a private online-only university that is located in Orange Beach, with a campus in Orange Beach on Canal Road and a larger campus on the Beach Express road.

Recreation

Orange Beach offers a wide selection of family beach vacation opportunities, from condos directly on the beach to just across the street, dolphin cruises, recreational centers with tennis and basketball courts, golf course condo communities, beach houses and everything in between.

For entertainment, locals and visitors head to the Orange Beach Islands, also known as the Islands of Perdido Pass, consisting of Bird Island, Robinson Island, Gilchrist Island, and Walker Island. All 4 islands of the Perdido Pass are located within minutes of each other. There is no safe way of getting to the Orange Beach Islands by foot, and the currents make it unsafe to swim. The best way to get to the Orange Beach Islands is by boat, kayak, paddleboard, or jet ski.

References

External links

City of Orange Beach official website

Cities in Alabama
Populated places established in 1984
Cities in Baldwin County, Alabama
Populated coastal places in Alabama
Beaches of Alabama